Amphictyon or Amphiktyon, in Greek mythology, was a king of Thermopylae and later Athens. In one account, he was the ruler of Locris.

Etymology 
The name of Amphictyon is a back-formation from Amphictyons, plural, from Latin Amphictyones,  from Greek Amphiktyones, Amphiktiones, literally, "neighbors" or "those dwelling around" from amphi- + -ktyones, -ktiones (from ktizein to found); akin to Sanskrit kṣeti he dwells, kṣiti abode, Avestan shitish dwelling, Armenian šen inhabited, cultivated.

Family 
Amphictyon was the second son of Deucalion and Pyrrha, although there was also a tradition that he was autochthonous (born from the earth); he was also said to be a son of Hellen, his brother in the first account. Amphictyon's other (possible) siblings besides Hellen were Protogeneia,  Thyia, Pandora II, Melantho (Melanthea) and Candybus. 

Amphictyon married a daughter of King Cranaus of Athens. 

Amphictyon had a son, Itonus, who in his turn became the father of Boeotus, Iodame and Chromia by Melanippe. He also had a daughter, never mentioned by name, who became the mother of Cercyon by Poseidon, and of Triptolemus by Rarus. Some added that Amphictyon had another son, Physcus, by Chthonopatra, daughter of his brother Hellen. However, others stated that Physcus was the grandson of Amphictyon through Aetolus. In this late account, the kingdom of Locris was ruled from Amphictyon to Aetolus, then Physcus and eventually, Locrus who gave his name to the land.

Mythology 
One account related that during the reign of King Cranaus, Deucalion, who founded and ruled over Lycoreia in Mt. Parnassus, was said to have fled from his kingdom during the great flood with his sons Hellen and Amphictyon, and seek refuge to Athens. Later on, the latter became king of Thermopylae and brought together those living round about the temple and named them Amphictyons, and sacrificed on their behalf. While ruling in his new kingdom, Amphictyon's brother Hellen emigrated to Phthiotis where he became the ruler.

Eventually, Amphictyon deposed Cranaus and proclaimed himself king of Athens. Amphictyon ruled the kingdom for 10, or in some accounts, 12 years and founded the Amphictyonic League which traditionally met at Thermopylae in historical times. During his rule, Dionysus was supposed to have visited him in Athens and taught him how to mix water with wine in the proper proportions. Amphictyon was later on dethroned by Erichthonius, another autochthonous king of Athens.

See also
 Amphictyonic league, or Amphictyony, an ancient religious association of tribes

Notes

References

Primary sources 
 Dionysus of Halicarnassus, Roman Antiquities. English translation by Earnest Cary in the Loeb Classical Library, 7 volumes. Harvard University Press, 1937–1950. Online version at Bill Thayer's Web Site
Dionysius of Halicarnassus, Antiquitatum Romanarum quae supersunt, Vol I-IV. . Karl Jacoby. In Aedibus B.G. Teubneri. Leipzig. 1885. Greek text available at the Perseus Digital Library.
Pausanias, Description of Greece with an English Translation by W.H.S. Jones, Litt.D., and H.A. Ormerod, M.A., in 4 Volumes. Cambridge, MA, Harvard University Press; London, William Heinemann Ltd. 1918. . Online version at the Perseus Digital Library
Pausanias, Graeciae Descriptio. 3 vols. Leipzig, Teubner. 1903.  Greek text available at the Perseus Digital Library.
Pseudo-Apollodorus, The Library with an English Translation by Sir James George Frazer, F.B.A., F.R.S. in 2 Volumes, Cambridge, MA, Harvard University Press; London, William Heinemann Ltd. 1921. . Online version at the Perseus Digital Library. Greek text available from the same website.
Stephanus of Byzantium, Stephani Byzantii Ethnicorum quae supersunt, edited by August Meineike (1790-1870), published 1849. A few entries from this important ancient handbook of place names have been translated by Brady Kiesling. Online version at the Topos Text Project.

Secondary sources 
 Gantz, Timothy, Early Greek Myth: A Guide to Literary and Artistic Sources, Johns Hopkins University Press, 1996, Two volumes:  (Vol. 1),  (Vol. 2).
Smith, William; Dictionary of Greek and Roman Biography and Mythology, London (1873). "Amphictyon"

Kings of Athens
Kings in Greek mythology
Autochthons of classical mythology
Deucalionids
Locrian characters in Greek mythology
Thessalian characters in Greek mythology
Attic mythology
Locris
Thessalian mythology
Delphic amphictyony